Maria Mikhailovna Blumenthal-Tamarina (née Klimova, born 16 July 1859 – October 16, 1939), was a Soviet and Russian movie and theater actress. She was given the title of People's Artist of the USSR (1936) and was one of the first actresses to receive this honor. She was also recognized as Honored Artist of the Russian Soviet Federative Socialist Republic (also known as the RSFSR) in 1925 and People's Artist of RSFSR in 1928. She was also named a recipient of the Order of Lenin and the Order of the Red Banner of Labour.

Biography 
Maria Blumenthal-Tamarina's father, Mikhail, was born a serf. Maria graduated in 1875 from the Mariinsky de Saint-Petersburg gymnasium. In 1880, she married a drama teacher and actor named Alexander Eduardovich Blumenthal-Tamarin. Her stage debut was in 1885, when she became part of an amateur theater group. By 1887, she had appeared with a professional troupe in the Alexandre Dumas play Kean at Petrovsky Park in Moscow.

By 1889, she began working in the Mikhail Valentovich Lentovsky Theater Group. This troupe traveled throughout the Russian Empire between 1890 and 1901, reaching locations such as Tbilisi, Vladikavkaz, Rostov-on-Don, and Kharkiv. Upon returning to Moscow, Blumenthal-Tamarina worked at the Korsh Theatre, the Comedy Theater, the Soukhodolski Theater, and the Maly Drama Theatre (1933-1938). In 1911, she worked on the Boris Tchaikovsky silent movie The Living Corpse.

Throughout her career, Blumenthal-Tamarina appeared in over 20 films. In 1936, she performed the main role in the movie Seekers of Happiness, which tells the story of a Jewish family that moves to the Jewish colony of Birobidzhan

Maria Blumenthal-Tamarina was awarded the Order of Lenin and the Order of the Red Banner of Labour in 1937.

She died on October 16, 1938, in Moscow. She was buried in Novodevichy Cemetery.

Filmography 

 1911: The Living Corpse by Boris Tchaikovsky: Lisa
 1916: Merry Nursery Girl: Anna Markovna Kozelskaya
 1916: Star Glistening in the Distance: Elisa's mother
 1923: Brigade Commander Ivanov by Aleksandr Razumny: Deaconess
 1923: On the Wings of the Sky!: Glagoleva's wife
 1924: In the Wilds of Life: Grandmother
 1925: The Road to Happiness: Arina
 1925: His Call by Yakov Protazanov: Grandmother Katie
 1925: Bricks: Sidorovna
 1926: The Mighty: Mother of the character Stout
 1926: The Driver Ukhtomsky: Sapozhnikov
 1926: The Last Shot: Grandma Lukerya
 1928: Don Diego and Pelagia by Yakov Protazanov: Pelagia Demina
 1928: Vasilisina Victory: Grandmother Zaychikha
 1928: Two Rivals: Mother Firsova
 1928: The Seventh Satellite: Polinka
 1928: For Your Health
 1928: Sailor Ivan Galai: Mother of Galai
 1932: Counterplan by Fridrikh Ermler and Sergei Ioutkevitch: Babtchikha
 1933: The International
 1934: Peasants: Collective Farmer
 1935: Zoya's Friends
 1936: Girl Friends by Lev Arnshtam: Fekla Petrovna
 1936: Seekers of Happiness by Vladimir Korsh-Sablin and Joseph Shapiro (also  or Chapiro): Dvora
 1937: Daughter of the Motherland: Grandma Martha
 1938: The New Moscow: Grandmother

References

External links 
  

1859 births
1938 deaths
19th-century actresses from the Russian Empire
20th-century Russian actresses
Actresses from Saint Petersburg
Honored Artists of the RSFSR
People's Artists of the RSFSR
People's Artists of the USSR
Recipients of the Order of Lenin
Recipients of the Order of the Red Banner of Labour
Actresses from the Russian Empire
Russian film actresses
Russian stage actresses
Soviet film actresses
Soviet stage actresses
Burials at Novodevichy Cemetery